Pir-o-Murshid is an esoteric title, signifying the head of some Sufi Schools. It is also a title of respect given to spiritual leaders.

Sufism